Gandahar is a 1987 French animated science fantasy film written and directed by René Laloux, based on Jean-Pierre Andrevon's 1969 novel Les Hommes-machines contre Gandahar (The Machine-Men versus Gandahar).

Plot
The peaceful people of Gandahar are suddenly attacked by an army of automata known as the Men of Metal, that march through the villages and kidnap their victims by turning them to stone. The resulting statues are collected and then transferred to their base. At the capital city of Jasper, the Council of Women orders Sylvain to investigate. On his journey, he encounters the Deformed, a race of mutant beings who were accidentally created via genetic experimentation by Gandahar's scientists. Despite their resentment, they are also threatened by the Men of Metal and offer to help Sylvain.

Sylvain later saves Airelle, a Gandaharian woman. Together they discover the Men of Metal's base, where the frozen Gandaharians are taken through a large portal and are seemingly assimilated into more Men of Metal. The two stow away on a nearby boat which heads towards the middle of the ocean where they encounter Metamorphis, a giant brain. Sylvain and Airelle are captured and confronted by Metamorphis, who tells them that although the Men of Metal believe that he is their leader, he did not create them nor order their attack. He states that he does not want to see Gandahar fall, and that he needs time to figure out the connection between him and the Men of Metal. He then returns Sylvain and Airelle to Jasper where they learn that Metamorphis, like the Deformed, was also an experiment by Gandaharian scientists. Due to his rapid growth and increasingly violent behavior, he was abandoned in the ocean. Sylvain is ordered to kill Metamorphis with a special syringe. Sylvain returns to Metamorphis, who maintains his innocence but reveals that the Men of Metal come from the future via the portal Sylvain saw earlier. He then urges Sylvain to kill him in a thousand years, as the syringe would have no effect on him now. A skeptical Sylvain agrees and Metamorphis puts him into stasis.

A thousand years later, Sylvain awakens just as they had agreed. He comes across the Deformed, who explain the true nature behind the Men of Metal: Due to Metamorphis's now advanced age, his cells can no longer regenerate, which drove him to create the Men of Metal and order them to go back in time to capture the Gandaharians so he could absorb their cells to continue living, killing the Gandaharians in the process. The metal comes from Metamorphis's dead cells metallizing with time. The Deformed, however, were abandoned as they were considered undesirable. Sylvain and the Deformed then agree to work together. The Deformed fight off the Men of Metal and rescue the remaining Gandaharians while Sylvain goes to face Metamorphis alone. The Deformed destroy the reservoir supplying Metamorphis with new cells, distracting him long enough to let Sylvain inject the syringe into Metamorphis which kills him. Sylvain, along with the Deformed and the Gandaharians escape through the portal back to their time.

Cast

Additional Voices
Original: Zaïra Benbadis (Recorded Voice), Claude Degliame (Recorded Voice), Olivier Cruveiller (Man-metal), Jean-Pierre Jorris (process), Dominique Maurin-Collignon (process), Jean-Jacques Scheffer (process), Jean Saudray (process), Frédéric Witta (process), Philippe Noël (process), Philippe Duclos (process), Joël Barbouth (process), Michel Charrel (process), Roland Lacoste (process)
English: Alexander Marshall (Apod, The Metal Man), Paul Shaffer (Optiflow), Earle Hyman (Maxum), Raymond Joseph Teller (Octum), Penn Jillette (Chief of the Deformed), Earle Hyman (Chief of the Deformed), Dennis Predovic (The Head, The Metal Man), Bridget Fonda (The Head, Historian), Chip Bolcik (The Head, The Metal Man), Sheila McCarthy (The Head), David Johansen (Shayol), Terrence Mann (The Collective Voice), Kevin O'Rourke (The Metal Man), Ray Owens (The Metal Man), Jill Haworth (Announcer), Jennifer Grey (Airelle), Charles Busch (Gemnen) and Glenn Close as Ambisextra.

Production
The animation was in colour and ran for 83 minutes. Production work was done by SEK Animation Studio of North Korea. The film is notable for its strange scenery and exotic flora, fauna, and bizarre inhabitants. The design was by the French comic book artist Caza.

English version
An English language version was directed by Harvey Weinstein and produced by Bob Weinstein through Miramax Films, with the translation revision done by noted science-fiction author Isaac Asimov. The English title is a translation, not of the original title, but of the original tagline "Les Années lumière" (The Light Years) as seen on the French poster.

 The English version does not contain most of Yared's soundtrack for the original version of the film. New music was produced for certain sequences in the English-language version, these new pieces were created by the combined efforts of Jack Maeby, Bob Jewitt and Jim Klein.
 A certain scene was edited for sexual content – the scene where Airelle and Sylvain are in the nest. In the uncut version, Sylvain is shown removing his shirt, later, he and Airelle are shown lying nude in the nest at night, seemingly after having been intimate with one another.

Availability
A European DVD release of Gandahar, in French with English subtitles, was released in October 2007  by Eureka!'s Masters of Cinema label. There are currently no plans for a Region 1 DVD release.

References

External links
 
 
 
 Gandahar at Le Palais des dessins animés

1987 films
1987 animated films
1980s science fiction films
1980s French animated films
French adult animated films
Animated films based on novels
French fantasy adventure films
Films based on fantasy novels
Films based on French novels
Films directed by René Laloux
French animated science fiction films
French animated fantasy films
Films about genetic engineering
French independent films
Films set on fictional planets
Science fantasy films
Animated films about time travel
Films scored by Gabriel Yared
Miramax films
1980s French-language films
Alternative versions of films